Marie Henri Andoyer (October 1, 1862 in Paris – June 12, 1929) was a French astronomer and mathematician.

Biography
Andoyer was elected member of the French Académie des sciences on June 30, 1919 in the astronomy section.
He was member of the Bureau des longitudes.

The following short notice is excerpted from a set of biographical notices published in the document http://www.academie-sciences.fr/ama/appendice.pdf made by Jean-Claude Pecker for the Académie des sciences using various dictionaries:

Family
Andoyer's daughter married the mathematician Pierre Humbert (1891–1953).
Andoyer's eldest son was killed during World War I.

Manuscripts
Henri Andoyer. Nouvelles tables trigonométriques fondamentales. Valeurs naturelles (Bibliothèque de la Sorbonne, MS 1864-1875)

Publications
Many articles are available here: http://adsabs.harvard.edu/cgi-bin/nph-abs_connect?return_req=no_params&author=Andoyer,%20H.&db_key=AST
On Mathematics:
Charles Hermite: Cours professé pendant le 2e semestre 1881-1882 [à la Faculté des sciences de Paris], written by Andoyer, 1882 (4th edition in 1891: http://historical.library.cornell.edu//cgi-bin/cul.math/docviewer?did=04470002&seq=7)
On geometry:
Henri Andoyer: Sur un problème de géométrie, Annales de la faculté des sciences de Toulouse, Sér. 1 Vol. 3 (1889), p. D1-D6, http://archive.numdam.org/article/AFST_1889_1_3__D1_0.pdf
Henri Andoyer: Leçons élémentaires sur la théorie des formes et ses applications géométriques, à l'usage des candidats à l'agrégation des sciences mathématiques, 1898
Henri Andoyer: Leçons sur la théorie des formes et la géométrie analytique supérieure : à l'usage des étudiants des facultés des sciences. Tome I, 1900, http://www.hti.umich.edu/cgi/t/text/text-idx?c=umhistmath;idno=AAM8328
Henri Andoyer: Cours de géométrie : à l'usage des élèves de l'enseignement primaire supérieur : ouvrage rédigé conformément au programme officiel de 1893, 1894 (1st edition), 1895 (2nd edition), 1896 (3rd edition)
Henri Andoyer: Cours de géométrie, 1910	
 Henri Andoyer: Formule donnant la longueur de la géodésique joignant 2 points de l’ellipsoïde donnés par leurs coordonnées géographiques, Bulletin Géodésique, Volume 34, Number 1, April 1932, pages 77–81, https://doi.org/10.1007%2FBF03030136
On algebra:
Henri Andoyer: Cours d'algèbre à l'usage des élèves de l'enseignement primaire supérieur, 1896
On arithmetic:
Henri Andoyer : Cours d'arithmétique à l'usage des élèves de l'enseignement primaire supérieur, 2e édition, 1898
Miscellaneous :
D. Selivanov, J. Bauschinger, H. Andoyer : Calcul des différences et interpolation. Encyclopédie des sciences mathématiques pures et appliquées, tome I (4e volume), Calcul des probabilités, théorie des erreurs et applications diverses, Paris, Gauthier-Villars, 1906, p. 47-160.
On the theory of the Moon:
Henri Andoyer: Sur quelques inégalités de la longitude de la lune, Annales de la faculté des sciences de Toulouse, Sér. 1 Vol. 6 no. 3 (1892), p. J1-J33, http://archive.numdam.org/article/AFST_1892_1_6_3_J1_0.pdf
Henri Andoyer: Sur quelques inégalités de la longitude de la Lune (deuxième mémoire), Annales de la faculté des sciences de Toulouse, Sér. 1 Vol. 7 no. 2 (1893), p. E1-E19, http://archive.numdam.org/article/AFST_1893_1_7_2_E1_0.pdf
Henri Andoyer: La Théorie de la lune, 1902, 1926, http://gallica.bnf.fr/ark:/12148/bpt6k82011r.r=.langFR
Henri Andoyer: Sur la théorie analytique du mouvement de la lune, Journal de mathématiques pures et appliquées, 9e série, tome 7, 1928, pages 61–74,  https://web.archive.org/web/20110717152849/http://www-mathdoc.ujf-grenoble.fr/JMPA/PDF/JMPA_1928_9_7_A4_0.pdf
On celestial mechanics in general:
Henri Andoyer : Sur la réduction du problème des brachistochrones aux équations canoniques, 1885. C.R. [Comptes Rendus des Séances de l'Académie des Sciences. Paris.] 100, 1577-1578. http://gallica.bnf.fr/ark:/12148/bpt6k3056t/f1577n2.capture
Henri Andoyer: Contribution à la théorie des orbites intermédiaires, Annales de la faculté des sciences de Toulouse, 1re série, tome 1, numéro 4, 1887, pages M1-M72, http://archive.numdam.org/ARCHIVE/AFST/AFST_1887_1_1_4/AFST_1887_1_1_4_M1_0/AFST_1887_1_1_4_M1_0.pdf
Henri Andoyer : Sur une équation différentielle que l'on rencontre dans la théorie des orbites intermédiaires, 1887. C.R. [Comptes Rendus des Séances de l'Académie des Sciences. Paris.] 104, 1425-1427. http://gallica.bnf.fr/ark:/12148/bpt6k30607/f1424n3.capture
Henri Andoyer: Sur les formules générales de la mécanique céleste, Annales de la faculté des sciences de Toulouse, Sér. 1 Vol. 4 no. 2 (1890), p. K1-K35, http://archive.numdam.org/article/AFST_1890_1_4_2_K1_0.pdf
Henri Andoyer : Sur l'extension que l'on peut donner au théorème de Poisson, relatif à l'invariabilité des grands axes, 1896. C.R. [Comptes Rendus des Séances de l'Académie des Sciences. Paris.] 123, 790-793. http://gallica.bnf.fr/ark:/12148/bpt6k30799/f790n4.capture
Henri Andoyer: Sur la détermination d'une orbite képlérienne par trois observations rapprochées, Bulletin Astronomique, Serie I, vol. 34 (1917), pp. 36–67 http://adsabs.harvard.edu/full/1917BuAsI..34...36A
Henri Andoyer: Formules et tables nouvelles : relatives à l'étude du mouvement des comètes et a différents problèmes de la théorie des orbites, 1918
Henri Andoyer: Cours de mécanique céleste, 1923 (volume 1), 1926 (volume 2), https://archive.org/details/coursdemcaniqu00andouoft (volume 1), https://archive.org/details/coursdemcaniqu01andouoft (volume 2)
Tables of logarithms and trigonometric functions:
Henri Andoyer: Nouvelles tables trigonométriques fondamentales : contenant les logarithmes des lignes trigonométriques de centième en centième du quadrant avec dix-sept décimales, de neuf en neuf minutes avec quinze décimales, et de dix en dix secondes avec quatorze décimales, 1911 (reconstructed on http://locomat.loria.fr)
Henri Andoyer: Nouvelles tables trigonométriques fondamentales contenant les valeurs naturelles des lignes trigonométriques de centième en centième du quadrant avec vingt décimales, de neuf en neuf minutes avec dix-sept décimales et de dix en dix secondes avec quinze décimales, 1915-1918 (3 volumes), https://archive.org/details/nouvellestablest01andouoft, https://archive.org/details/nouvellestablest02andouoft, https://archive.org/details/nouvellestablest03andouoft (reconstructed on http://locomat.loria.fr)
Henri Andoyer: Tables logarithmiques à treize décimales, 1922 (review in 1923 by C. H. Forsyth, http://projecteuclid.org/DPubS/Repository/1.0/Disseminate?view=body&id=pdf_1&handle=euclid.bams/1183485665) (reconstructed on http://locomat.loria.fr)
Henri Andoyer: Tables fondamentales pour les logarithmes d'addition et de soustraction. In Bulletin Astronomique, volume 2, pages 5–32, 1922.
Astronomy and cosmography:
F. Tisserand et H. Andoyer: Leçons de cosmographie, 1895, 1899, 1907 (4th edition), 1909 (5th edition), 1912 (6th edition), 1916 (7th edition), 1920 (8th edition), 1925 (9th edition), 1929 (10th edition), http://gallica.bnf.fr/ark:/12148/bpt6k95058b (review by Ernest W. Brown: Bull. Amer. Math. Soc. Volume 5, Number 5 (1899), 259. http://projecteuclid.org/DPubS/Repository/1.0/Disseminate?view=body&id=pdf_1&handle=euclid.bams/1183415717)
Henri Andoyer: Cours d'astronomie (only the first two volumes are by Andoyer).
volume 1: Astronomie théorique (1st edition: 1906 http://gallica.bnf.fr/ark:/12148/bpt6k947957, 2nd edition: 1911, 3rd edition: 1923)
volume 2: Astronomie pratique (1st edition: 1909 http://gallica.bnf.fr/ark:/12148/bpt6k94796k, 2nd edition (with A. Lambert): 1924)
volume 3: Astrophysique (1928, by Jean Bosler only) (review: A. Pogo, Astrophysical Journal, volume 69, page 242, 1929 http://adsabs.harvard.edu/full/1929ApJ....69..242P)
Historical works:
Henri Andoyer: L'œuvre scientifique de Laplace, 1922, https://archive.org/details/loeuvrescientifi00andouoft
Henri Andoyer, Pierre Humbert, Histoire de la Nation Française. Tome XIV, Histoire des Sciences en France; première partie, Histoire des Mathématiques, de la Mécanique et de l'Astronomie. Paris, 1924. xx+620 pp
Notice sur les travaux scientifiques de M. H. Andoyer, (several versions : 1902 (29 pages), 1904 (32 pages), 1907 (58 pages), 1918 (28 pages))

References

Obituaries:
Nature volume 124, issue 3116, 102 (20 July 1929), http://www.nature.com/nature/journal/v124/n3116/abs/124102a0.html
Monthly Notices of the Royal Astronomical Society, Vol. 90, pp. 384–386, http://articles.adsabs.harvard.edu/cgi-bin/nph-iarticle_query?journal=MNRAS&year=1929&volume=..90&page_ind=395.
Benjamin Baillaud: Henri Andoyer, Journal des observateurs, volume XII, number 11, 15 November 1929, pages 193-198, http://adsabs.harvard.edu/full/1929JO.....12..193B
Obituary, Ciel et Terre, Volume 45, 1929, p. 356, http://adsabs.harvard.edu/full/1929C%26T....45..356D
Other biographical documents:
M. P. Caubet: Henri Andoyer, vu par un de ses élèves, Journal des observateurs, volume XIII, number 4, April 1930, pages 61–64, http://adsabs.harvard.edu/full/1930JO.....13...61C
M. P. Caubet: Sur le rôle des astronomes calculateurs, Journal des observateurs, volume XIV, numéro 1, Janvier 1931, pages 1–3, http://adsabs.harvard.edu/full/1931JO.....14....1C
Armand Lambert: Henri Andoyer, 1949 (17 p.)
Charles Maurain: Notice sur la vie et les travaux de Henri Andoyer (1862–1929), présentée en la séance du 22 décembre 1930, 1937 (Institut de France. Académie des Sciences. Notices et discours. Tome I, pp. 329 à 340)
Jérôme Lamy: Henri Andoyer, Biographical Encyclopedia of Astronomers

19th-century French astronomers
Members of the French Academy of Sciences
1862 births
1929 deaths
Scientists from Paris
20th-century French astronomers